Breccia Peak is a mountain in north-central British Columbia, Canada.

References

Two-thousanders of British Columbia
Omineca Mountains
Cassiar Land District